

2003

References

2003
Films
Cambodia